Nelson Fernando Acevedo (born 11 July 1988) is an Argentine professional footballer who plays as a midfielder for Primera División club Unión La Calera.

Career

Club
Acevedo began his professional career in the Argentine second division, the Primera B Nacional, with Defensa y Justicia. He made his first-team debut for the team towards the end of the 2008–09 Primera B Nacional season, with his first match coming against Platense. He played three games in total in 2008–09. In the following season he played 18 times in the league before making just one Primera B Nacional appearance in 2010–11, against Almirante Brown in a game where he was sent off, and seven in 2011–12. He featured much more in his next two seasons (2012–13 and 2013–14) as he participated in 72 league matches and scored four goals. 2013–14 proved to be Acevedo's final season with Defensa y Justicia but it ended on a high as the club finished second to gain promotion into the 2014 Argentine Primera División.

As Defensa y Justicia moved up a division, Acevedo did too as he agreed to join Racing Club de Avellaneda in July 2014. His Racing debut actually came against his former club, Defensa y Justicia, on 9 August 2014 as his new side beat his old one 1–3. 13 appearances followed for him in 2014 before he played 10 times in 2015. Ahead of the 2016 season, Acevedo was loaned to Unión Santa Fe. Just like his debut for Racing, his Unión debut came against former club Defensa y Justicia; this time the match ended 2–2. He scored his first goal for Unión on 7 May 2016 versus Argentinos Juniors. In July 2018, he signed a two-year permanent contract with Union. On 20 January 2020, Acevedo was loaned out to his former club Defensa y Justicia for one year.

In the summer 2021, Acevedo signed a 1,5-year deal with Godoy Cruz.

Career statistics

Club
.

Honours

Club
Racing Club de Avellaneda
 Argentine Primera División (1): 2014

References

External links
 
 Nelson Acevedo at RacingClub.com.ar 
 
 

Living people
People from Resistencia, Chaco
Argentine footballers
Association football midfielders
Defensa y Justicia footballers
Racing Club de Avellaneda footballers
Unión de Santa Fe footballers
Godoy Cruz Antonio Tomba footballers
Argentine Primera División players
Primera Nacional players
1988 births
Sportspeople from Chaco Province